Suresh Chatwal was an Indian  film actor  who  has performed in films as well as television serials. He has acted in Hindi films. mainly as supporting actor. He has worked in movies like Mili, Phool Aur Kaante, Kaya Palat, Uphaar, Munna Bhai MBBS etc. He works with actors like Ashok Kumar, Anoop Kumar, and  Mithun Chakraborty etc. Beside acting on films he was also a good singer.

Career
After getting a break Chatwal made his acting debut in the year 1969 with "Rakhi Rakhi". and was seen in films like "Karan Arjun", "Koyla" and "Munna Bhai MBBS".  He acted more than 300 Hindi movies.

Death
He died on 28 May 2016 in Mumbai, Maharashtra, India.

Filmography

Rakhi Rakhi (1969)
Uphaar (1971)
Piya Ka Ghar (1972)
Mere Bhaiya (1972)
Kunwara Badan (1973)
Honey Moon (1973)
Agni Rekha (1973)
Alingan (1974)
Mili (1975) 
Aaina (1977)
Swami (1977 film) Swami (1978)
Beqasoor (1980 film)
Sitara (1980)
Chehre Pe Chehra (1981)
Be-Shaque (1981)
Yeh To Kamal Ho Gaya (1982)
Pyar Ke Rahi (1982)
Apmaan (1983)
Kaya Palat (1983)
Saaheb (1985)
Sheesa (1986)
 Aaj (1987)
Taqdeer Ka Tamasha (1988)
Lootera Sultan (1990)
Thanedaar (1990)
Indrajeet (1991)
Phool Aur Kaante (1991)
Lambu Dada (1992)
Jaan Se Pyaara (1992)
Khoon Ka Sindoor (1993)Dhartiputra (1993)
Dil Ki Baazi (1993)Dalaal (1993) Ganga Aur Ranga (1994)Saajan Ki Bahon Mein (1995)Karan Arjun (1995)Gundaraj (1995)Fauji (1995 film) Diljale (1996)
Ziddi (1997 film)Koyla (1997)Daadagiri (1997)Phool Bane Patthar (1998)
 Barood (1998 film)Pardesi Babu (1998)Kya Kehna (2000)Karobaar: The Business of Love (2000)One 2 Ka 4 (2001)Mujhe meri bibi se Bachao (2001)Hawa (2003)Munna Bhai M.B.B.S(2003)Lakeer (2004)Bhola in Bollywood (2004)Jo Bole So Nihaal (2005)Om Shanti Om (2007)
 GaltiyaanThe Camp''

Television
He acted in several TV serials  like F.I.R. (TV series)  
Bhabhiji Ghar par Hai
VIBHUTI's London Uncle

References

External links 
 

1954 births
2016 deaths
20th-century Indian actors
20th-century Indian male actors
21st-century Indian male actors
Indian male film actors
Male actors in Hindi cinema
Indian male television actors
Place of birth missing